The European emission standards are vehicle emission standards for pollution from the use of new land surface vehicles sold in the European Union and European Economic Area member states and the United Kingdom, and ships in EU waters. The standards are defined in a series of European Union directives staging the progressive introduction of increasingly stringent standards. 

, the standards do not include non-exhaust emissions such as particulates from tyres and brakes.

Background 

In the European Union, emissions of nitrogen oxides, total hydrocarbon (THC), non-methane hydrocarbons (NMHC), carbon monoxide (CO) and particulate matter (PM) are regulated for most vehicle types, including cars, trucks (lorries), locomotives, tractors and similar machinery, barges, but excluding seagoing ships and aeroplanes. For each vehicle type, different standards apply. Compliance is determined by running the engine at a standardised test cycle. Non-compliant vehicles cannot be sold in the EU, but new standards do not apply to vehicles already on the roads. No use of specific technologies is mandated to meet the standards, though available technology is considered when setting the standards. New models introduced must meet current or planned standards, but minor lifecycle model revisions may continue to be offered with pre-compliant engines.

Along with Emissions standards the European Union has also mandated a number of computer on-board diagnostics for the purposes of increasing safety for drivers. These standards are used in relation to the emissions standards.

In the early 2000s, Australia began harmonising Australian Design Rule certification for new motor vehicle emissions with Euro categories. Euro III was introduced on 1 January 2006 and is progressively being introduced to align with European introduction dates.

Toxic emission: stages and legal framework 
The stages are typically referred to as Euro 1, Euro 2, Euro 3, Euro 4, Euro 5 and Euro 6 for Light Duty Vehicle standards.

The legal framework consists in a series of directives, each amendments to the 1970 Directive 70/220/EEC. The following is a summary list of the standards, when they come into force, what they apply to, and which EU directives provide the definition of the standard.
 Euro 1 (1992):
 For passenger cars—91/441/EEC.
 Also for passenger cars and light lorries—93/59/EEC.
 Euro 2 (1996) for passenger cars—94/12/EC (& 96/69/EC)
 For motorcycle—2002/51/EC (row A)—2006/120/EC
 Euro 3 (2000) for any vehicle—98/69/EC
 For motorcycle—2002/51/EC (row B)—2006/120/EC
 Euro 4 (2005) for any vehicle—98/69/EC (& 2002/80/EC)
 Euro 5 (2009) for light passenger and commercial vehicles—715/2007/EC
 Euro 6 (2014) for light passenger and commercial vehicles—459/2012/EC and 2016/646/EU
 Euro 7 (probably 2025)

These limits supersede the original directive on emission limits 70/220/EEC.

The classifications for vehicle category are defined by:
 Commission Directive 2001/116/EC of 20 December 2001, adapting to technical progress Council Directive 70/156/EEC on the approximation of the laws of the Member States relating to the type-approval of motor vehicles and their trailers
 Directive 2002/24/EC of the European Parliament and of the Council of 18 March 2002 relating to the type-approval of two or three-wheeled motor vehicles and repealing Council Directive 92/61/EEC

Emission standards for passenger cars
Emission standards for passenger cars and light commercial vehicles are summarised in the following tables. Since the Euro 2 stage, EU regulations introduce different emission limits for diesel and petrol vehicles. Diesels have more stringent CO standards but are allowed higher  emissions. Petrol-powered vehicles are exempted from particulate matter (PM) standards through to the Euro 4 stage, but vehicles with direct injection engines are subject to a limit of 0.0045 g/km for Euro 5 and Euro 6. A particulate number standard (P) or (PN) has been introduced in 2011 with Euro 5b for diesel engines and in 2014 with Euro 6 for petrol engines.

From a technical perspective, European emissions standards do not reflect everyday usage of the vehicle as manufacturers are allowed to lighten the vehicle by removing the back seats, improve aerodynamics by taping over grilles and door handles or reduce the load on the generator by switching off the headlights, the passenger compartment fan or simply disconnecting the alternator which charges the battery.

European emission standards for passenger cars (Category M), g/km

Emission standards for motor cycles (two and three wheelers) – L-category vehicles
The Euro emissions regulations for two and three wheelers (motorcycles) were first introduced in 1999 – some seven years after the cars were first regulated. In further difference to passenger cars (where three-way catalytic converters were de facto required from Euro I) it was first with the introduction of the Euro III emissions standard in 2006, that motorcycles were de facto required to use three-way catalytic converters. With the introduction of the Euro V, standard two-stroke engine motorcycles are challenged by the strict HC and PM emissions limits. It is expected that technologies such as direct injection combined with petrol particulate filters could be needed for these motorcycle engine types to meet the Euro V demands.

Emission standards for light commercial vehicles

European emission standards for light commercial vehicles ≤ 1,305 kg reference mass (Category N1 Class I), g/km

European emission standards for light commercial vehicles 1,305–1,760 kg reference mass (Category N1 Class II), g/km

European emission standards for light commercial vehicles > 1,760 kg reference mass max 3,500 kg. (Category N1 Class III & N2), g/km

Emission standards for trucks and buses

The emission standards for trucks (lorries) and buses are defined by engine energy output in g/kWh; this is unlike the emission standards for passenger cars and light commercial vehicles, which are defined by vehicle driving distance in g/km – a general comparison to passenger cars is therefore not possible, as the kWh/km factor depends (among other) on the specific vehicle.

The official category name is heavy-duty diesel engines, which generally includes lorries and buses.

The following table contains a summary of the emission standards and their implementation dates. Dates in the tables refer to new type approvals; the dates for all new registrations are in most cases one year later.

European emission standards for heavy-duty diesel engines, g/kWh

Emission standards for large goods vehicles

Enhanced environmentally friendly vehicle

Enhanced environmentally friendly vehicle or EEV is a term used in the European emission standards for the definition of a "clean vehicle" > 3.5 tonne in the category M2 and M3. The standard lies between the levels of Euro V and Euro VI.

Emission standards for non-road mobile machinery

The term non-road mobile machinery (NRMM) is a term used in the European emission standards to control emissions of engines that are not used primarily on public roadways. This definition includes off-road vehicles as well as railway vehicles.

European standards for non-road diesel engines harmonise with the US EPA standards, and comprise gradually stringent tiers known as Stage I–V standards. The Stage I/II was part of the 1997 directive (Directive 97/68/EC). It was implemented in two stages with Stage I implemented in 1999 and Stage II implemented between 2001 and 2004. In 2004, the European Parliament adopted Stage III/IV standards. The Stage III standards were further divided into Stage III A and III B were phased in between 2006 and 2013. Stage IV standards are enforced from 2014. Stage V standards are phased-in from 2018 with full enforcement from 2021.

As of 1 January 2015, EU Member States have to ensure that ships in the Baltic, the North Sea and the English Channel are using fuels with a sulphur content of no more than 0.10%. Higher sulphur contents are still possible, but only if the appropriate exhaust cleaning systems are in place.

Emission test cycle 

Just as important as the regulations are the tests needed to ensure adherence to regulations. These are laid out in standardised emission test cycles used to measure emissions performance against the regulatory thresholds applicable to the tested vehicle.

Light duty vehicles 
Since the Euro 3 regulations in 2000, performance has been measured using the New European Driving Cycle test (NEDC; also known as MVEG-B), with a "cold start" procedure that eliminates the use of a 40-second engine warm-up period found in the ECE+EUDC test cycle (also known as MVEG-A).

Heavy duty vehicles 
The two groups of emissions standards for heavy duty vehicles each have different appropriate test requirements. Steady-state testing is used for diesel engines only, while transient testing applies to both diesel and petrol engines.

"Cycle beating" controversy  

For the emission standards to deliver actual emission reductions it is crucial to use a test cycle that reflects real-world driving conditions. It was discovered that vehicle manufacturers would optimise emissions performance only for the test cycle, whilst emissions from typical driving conditions proved to be much higher than when tested. Some manufacturers were also found to use so-called defeat devices where the engine control system would recognise that the vehicle was being tested, and would automatically switch to a mode optimised for emissions performance. The use of a defeat device is expressly forbidden in EU law.

An independent study in 2014 used portable emissions measurement systems to measure  emissions during real world driving from fifteen Euro 6 compliant diesel passenger cars. The results showed that  emissions were on average about seven times higher than the Euro 6 limit. However, some of the vehicles did show reduced emissions, suggesting that real world  emission control is possible. In one particular instance, research in diesel car emissions by two German technology institutes found that zero 'real'  reductions in public health risk had been achieved despite 13 years of stricter standards (2006 report).

In 2015, the Volkswagen emissions scandal involved revelations that Volkswagen AG had deliberately falsified emission reports by programming engine management unit firmware to detect test conditions, and change emissions controls when under test. The cars thus passed the test, but in real world conditions, emitted up to forty times more  emissions than allowed by law. An independent report in September 2015 warned that this extended to "every major car manufacturer", with BMW, and Opel named alongside Volkswagen and its sister company Audi as "the worst culprits", and that approximately 90% of diesel cars "breach emissions regulations". Overlooking the direct responsibility of the companies involved, the authors blamed the violations on a number of factors, including "unrealistic test conditions, a lack of transparency and a number of loopholes in testing protocols".

In 2017, the European Union introduced testing in real-world conditions called Real Driving Emissions (RDE), using portable emissions measurement systems in addition to laboratory tests. Environment organisations criticized the decision as insufficient, while ACEA mentions it will be extremely difficult for automobile manufacturers to reach such a limit in such short period of time. In 2015 an ADAC study (ordered by ICCT) of 32 Euro 6 cars showed that few complied with on-road emission limits, and LNT/NOx adsorber cars (with about half the market) had the highest emissions. At the end of this study, ICCT was expecting a 100% conformity factor.

NEDC Euro 6b not to exceed limit of 80 mg/km  will then continue to apply for the WLTC Euro 6c tests performed on a dynomometer while WLTC-RDE will be performed in the middle of the traffic with a PEMS attached at the rear of the car. RDE testing is then far more difficult than the dynomometer tests. RDE not to exceed limits have then been updated to take into account different test conditions such as PEMS weight (305–533 kg in various ICCT testing), driving in the middle of the traffic, road gradient, etc.

ADAC also performed  emission tests with a cycle representative of the real driving environment in the laboratory. Among the 69 cars tested:
 17 cars emit less than 80 mg/km i-e do not emit more  on this more demanding cycle than on the NEDC cycle
 22 additional cars fall below the 110% conformity factor. In total: 57% of cars have then a good chance to be compatible with WLTC-RDE
 30 cars fall above the 110% conformity factor and have then to be improved to satisfy the WLTC-RDE test.

Since 2012, ADAC performs regular pollutant emission tests on a specific cycle in the laboratory duly representing a real driving environment and gives a global notation independent from the type of engine used (petrol, diesel, natural gas, LPG, hybrid, etc.). To get the maximum 50/50 note on this cycle, the car shall emit less than the minimum limit applicable to either petrol or diesel car, that is to say 100 mg HC, 500 mg CO, 60 mg , 3 mg PM and  PN. Unlike ambient discourse dirty diesel versus clean petrol cars, the results are much more nuanced and subtle. Some Euro 6 diesel cars perform as well as the best hybrid petrol cars; some other recent Euro 6 petrol indirect injection cars perform as the worst Euro 5 diesel cars; finally some petrol hybrid cars are at the same level as the best Euro 5 diesel cars.

Health impacts
After the postponement in publishing the Euro 7 proposal details by the European Commission some civil society groups (such as the European Respiratory Society and the European Public Health Alliance) said in mid-2022: "Every month that the implementation of Euro 7 is delayed due to the late publication of the proposal, 1 million more polluting cars will be placed on the EU’s road and stay there for decades to come."

emissions

Obligatory labelling
The purpose of Directive 1999/94/EC of the European Parliament and the Council of 13 December 1999 relating to the availability of consumer information on fuel economy and  emissions in respect of the marketing of new passenger cars is to ensure that information relating to the fuel economy and  emissions of new passenger cars offered for sale or lease in the Community is made available to consumers in order to enable consumers to make an informed choice.

In the United Kingdom, the initial approach was deemed ineffective. The way the information was presented was too complicated for consumers to understand. As a result, car manufacturers in the United Kingdom voluntarily agreed to put a more “consumer-friendly,” colour-coded label displaying  emissions on all new cars beginning in September 2005, with a letter from A (<100  g/km) to F (186+  g/km). The goal of the new "green label" is to give consumers clear information about the environmental performance of different vehicles.

Other EU member countries are also in the process of introducing consumer-friendly labels.

Obligatory vehicle  emission limits
European Union Directive No 443/2009 set a mandatory average fleet  emissions target for new cars, after a voluntary commitment made in 1998 and 1999 by the auto industry had failed to reduce emissions by 2007. The regulation applies to new passenger cars registered in the European Union and EEA member states for the first time. A carmaker who fails to comply has to pay an "excess emissions premium" for each vehicle registered according with the amount of g/km of exceeded.

The 2009 regulation set a 2015 target of 130 g/km for the fleet average for new passenger cars. A similar set of regulations for light commercial vehicles was set in 2011, with an emissions target of 175 g/km for 2017. Both targets were met several years in advance. A second set of regulations, passed in 2014, set a 2021 target of average  emissions of new cars to fall to 95 g/km by 2021, and for light-commercial vehicles to 147 g/km by 2020.

In April 2019, Regulation (EU) 2019/631 was adopted, which introduced  emission performance standards for new passenger cars and new light commercial vehicles for 2025 and 2030. The new Regulation went into force on 1 January 2020, and has replaced and repealed Regulation (EC) 443/2009 and (EU) No 510/2011. The 2019 Regulation set new emission targets relative to a 2021 baseline, with a reduction of the average  emissions from new cars by 15% in 2025, and by 37.5% in 2030. For light-commercial vehicles the new targets are a 15% reduction for 2025 and a 31% reduction for 2030.

Specific emissions targets for passenger cars

To account for different sizes of passenger cars, the specific emissions target for each passenger car is calculated by adjusting the general emissions target by a value proportional to the deviation of the car's mass from the average. This means that the emissions targets for heavier cars are higher than those for lighter cars. The Regulations determine the factor  as 0.0457 for 2012–2019 and as 0.0333 from 2020 onward.

Pooling

Two or more car manufacturers may form a pool which allows them to meet fleet targets as a group instead of having to meet them individually. The first pool was agreed among Tesla and Fiat Chrysler in 2019, reportedly costing Fiat Chrysler hundreds of millions of Euros. 

ZLEV Credit System

The 2019 Regulation also introduced an incentive mechanism or credit system from 2025 onwards for zero- and low-emission vehicles (ZLEVs). A ZLEV is defined as a passenger car or a commercial van with  emissions between 0 and 50 g/km. The regulation set ZLEV sales targets of 15% for 2025 and 35% for 2030, and manufacturers have some flexibility in how they achieve those targets. Carmakers that outperform the ZLEV sales targets will be rewarded with higher  emission targets, but the target relaxation is capped at a maximum 5% to safeguard the integrity of the regulation.

Electrification 

Many EU member states have responded to this problem by exploring the possibility of including electric vehicle-related infrastructure into their existing road traffic system, with some even having begun implementation. The UK has begun its "plugged-in-places" scheme which sees funding go to several areas across the UK to create a network of charging points for electric vehicles.

Around the world 
 From 1 January 2012, all new heavy vehicles in Brazil must comply with Proconve P7 (similar to Euro 5)
 From September 2014, all new cars in Chile must comply with Euro 5.
 From 1 January 2015, all new light vehicles in Brazil must comply with Proconve L6 (similar to Euro 5).
 From 1 January 2016, all new heavy vehicles in Argentina must comply with Euro 5.
 From January 2016, all new light vehicles in Russia must comply with Euro 5.
 From 1 September 2017, all new petrol vehicles in Singapore must comply with Euro 6 with new diesel vehicles following suit from 1 January 2018. 
 From 1 January 2018, all new vehicles in China must comply with China 5 (similar to Euro 5).
 From 1 January 2018, all new light and heavy vehicles in Argentina must comply with Euro 5.
 From 2018, all new heavy vehicles in Russia must comply with Euro 5.
 From 8 October 2018, all new gasoline cars in Indonesia must comply with Euro 4.
 From 1 July 2019, all new heavy vehicles in Mexico must comply with EPA 07 and Euro 5.
 From 1 January 2022, all new cars in Vietnam must comply with Euro 5.
 From 1 April 2020, all new 2, 3 or 4-wheelers in India must comply with BS VI (similar to Euro 6)
 From 1 January 2021, all new vehicles in China must comply with China 6a (similar to Euro 6).
 From 1 January 2022, all new light vehicles in Brazil must comply with Proconve L7 (similar to Euro 6).
 From September 2022, all new light and medium vehicle models in Chile must comply with Euro 6b.
 From 12 April 2022, all new diesel cars in Indonesia must comply with Euro 4.
 From 1 January 2023, all new heavy vehicles in Brazil must comply with Proconve P8 (similar to Euro 6).
 From 1 January 2023, all new vehicles in Colombia must comply with Euro 6.
 From 1 July 2023, all new vehicles in China must comply with China 6b (similar to Euro 6).
 From 1 January 2024, all new vehicles in Morocco must comply with Euro 6b.
 From September 2024, all new light and medium vehicle models in Chile must comply with Euro 6c.
 From 1 January 2025, all new heavy vehicles in Mexico must comply with EPA 10 and Euro 6.

See also

References

External links

 European emission standards.
 European Environment Agency
 EEA Glossary
 EEA transport page.
 EurActiv.com – Euro 5 emissions standards for cars 
 Dieselnet: EU emission standards
 Netherlands Environmental Assessment Agency The Impact of Euro 5 – Facts and figures.
 Commission proposal for Euro 5
 T&E: No diesel NOX reduction in 13 years due to cycle beating
 COM 2007/19 Results of the review of the Community Strategy to reduce  emissions from passenger cars and light-commercial vehicles
 European Commission conference (2003): Options to Reduce Greenhouse Gas Emissions due to Mobile Air Conditioning
 Delphi Technologies launches 26th worldwide emissions standards book

Emission standards
Carbon emissions in the European Union